The Stony River (Jamaica) rises just north of Coopers Hill in Saint Catherine Parish, Jamaica. From here it flows primarily north until it reaches its confluence with the New River.

See also
List of rivers of Jamaica

References

 GEOnet Names Server
Ford, Jos C. and Finlay, A.A.C. (1908).The Handbook of Jamaica. Jamaica Government Printing Office

External links
Aerial view of the source of the Stony River

Rivers of Jamaica